Mittermaier is a German surname. Notable people with the surname include:

Carl Joseph Anton Mittermaier (1787–1867), German jurist
Evi Mittermaier (born 1953), German alpine skier
Rosi Mittermaier (1950–2023), German alpine skier

See also
Mittermeier

German-language surnames